is a Japanese actress who has appeared in a number of feature films and television series. Her husband is singer-songwriter Takuro Yoshida.

Biography
She was born in Musashino, Tokyo. She graduated from Kojimachi Gakuen Girls' High School. She was scouted during her high school studies and debuted as a model. She debuted as an actress in 1977 in Jigoku no Tenshi: Akai Bakuon (Toei Company). She gained attention for her role in Third Base (1978).

She married Takuro Yoshida in December 1986. She suspended her career from 1988. Since returning to the Tokyo Broadcasting System Television drama Utsukushī Hito in 1999, her career has been even more active than before her break. She is regularly a cast member in Kankurō Kudō's works.

Filmography

TV dramas

Films

Stage

TV programmes

Advertisements

References

External links
Aiko Morishita – Nihon Tarento Meikan 
 – Takeda Kikaku 
Domoto Brothers #158 Aiko Morishita 

Japanese actresses
People from Musashino, Tokyo
1958 births
Living people